Kevin Nils Lennart Höög Jansson (born 29 September 2000) is a Swedish professional footballer who plays as a midfielder for Gangwon FC.

Career
In 2019, Höög Jansson signed for Mjällby in the Swedish Superettan from the youth academy of Swedish top flight side Helsingborg.

Before the second half of the 2019–20 season, he signed for Fremad Amager of the Danish 1st Division.

Before the second half of the 2020–21 season, he signed for Bulgarian top flight club Botev Plovdiv.

On 5 March 2022, he joined Gangwon FC of K League 1.

Personal life 
Höög Jansson is the son of the former professional footballer Jesper Jansson and the nephew of the former professional footballer Ulrik Jansson.

References

External links
 
 

2000 births
Living people
Sportspeople from Helsingborg
Swedish footballers
Association football midfielders
Superettan players
Danish 1st Division players
First Professional Football League (Bulgaria) players
K League 1 players
Mjällby AIF players
Fremad Amager players
Botev Plovdiv players
Gangwon FC players
Swedish expatriate footballers
Expatriate men's footballers in Denmark
Swedish expatriate sportspeople in Denmark
Expatriate footballers in Bulgaria
Swedish expatriate sportspeople in Bulgaria
Expatriate footballers in South Korea